Mark Wilkins may refer to:

Mark Wilkins (racing driver) (born 1983), professional sports car racing driver in the Grand-Am Rolex Sports Car Series
Mark Wilkins, a character in the video game Resident Evil Outbreak

See also
Marc Wilkins (disambiguation)